Scott Erickson (born 1967) is an American Los Angeles-based record producer, composer and arranger. Originally from Seattle, Washington, Erickson has been working in the music scene in Los Angeles since his graduation from Berklee College of Music in 1992.  After stints working as an assistant for The Manhattan Transfer and Al Teller (Chairman and CEO, MCA Music Entertainment Group), he landed a job working with Robbie Buchanan. From 1997 until 2003, Erickson learned the craft of making records and, in 2003, left Buchanan to begin his production career on his own. Since then, artists that Erickson has produced and/or arranged for include Barry Manilow, Mijares, Yuri, Carly Simon, Alison Krauss and Michelle Tumes. He also has arranged and composed music and songs for numerous Disney films and Live Entertainment shows at the Disney Theme Parks.

In 2008, Erickson's production work was honored with a Grammy Award nomination as a co-producer of Barry Manilow's In the Swing of Christmas album, that also marked his first Gold Record as a producer. 2009 marked his first Platinum record with Mijares' Vivir Así, which was followed shortly by the follow-up ,,Vivir Así Vol II'', that was certified Gold on the day of its release on April 14, 2010.  Following the success of the Mijares albums he has been asked by Warner Music México to produce a new album for Yuri, which was due out in mid-June 2010.

Erickson currently works out of his studio and resides in Los Angeles, California.

Artists worked with
Scott Erickson has produced, associate-produced, arranged, engineered or played on albums with the following artists:

 Barry Manilow
 Barbra Streisand
 Bette Midler
 The Manhattan Transfer
 Mijares
 Yuri
 Alison Krauss
 Carly Simon
 Johnny Mathis
 Michelle Tumes
 Ed Jordan
 Michael Crawford
 Davy Jones
 Peabo Bryson

References

1967 births
Living people
Record producers from Wisconsin
Record producers from California
American session musicians